Peace Kanwal (born 16 December, in the 1930s) is an Indian film actress and artist.

Early life 
Kanwal was born in Amritsar, the daughter of Indriyaas (Andrew) Munshilal Kanwal. Both parents were from Rajput families; her father was a Christian missionary and a doctor at hospitals in Agra and Amritsar. She was admitted to Ludhiana Medical College.

Career 
While in medical school, Kanwal won a national beauty contest in 1953, and followed an acting career instead. She appeared in several films between 1953 and 1991, including Dil-E-Nadaan (1953), Barati (1954), Kismet (1956), Barsaat Ki Raat (1960), Aarti (1962), Aasmaan (1982), and Woh Subah Kabhi to Aayegi (1991). She endorsed Kaminia Toiletries, including hair products, soap, and makeup; the product line's name was similar to that of her character, Kamini, in Dil-E-Nadaan.

Kanwal is a painter and has exhibited her art internationally, including a 1974 solo show in New York City. She is active on behalf of the War Widows Organization, Friends of Children, and Lioness Club.

Personal life 
Kanwal married Sushil Ruia in 1955. They had a son, and legally separated in 1968. Her second husband is V. Mahesh, grandson of politician V. V. Giri; they married in 1977. The couple live in Mumbai, as of 2020.

References

External links 

 
 

Living people
1930s births
Indian actresses
People from Amritsar
Indian artists